Thomas Barr may refer to:

Thomas J. Barr (1812–1881), U.S. Representative from New York
Thomas D. Barr (1931–2008), lawyer at Cravath, Swaine & Moore
Thomas Barr (athlete) (born 1992), Irish athlete
Tommy Barr (born 1942), Scottish footballer
Thomas Calhoun Barr Jr. (1931–2011), U.S. entomologist